The 2013 CAF Super Cup (also known as the 2013 Orange CAF Super Cup for sponsorship reasons) was the 21st CAF Super Cup, an annual football match in Africa organized by the Confederation of African Football (CAF), between the winners of the previous season's two CAF club competitions, the CAF Champions League and the CAF Confederation Cup.

The match was contested between Al-Ahly of Egypt, the 2012 CAF Champions League winner, and AC Léopards of the Republic of the Congo, the 2012 CAF Confederation Cup winner. It was hosted by Al-Ahly at the Borg El Arab Stadium in Alexandria on 23 February 2013.

Al-Ahly won the match 2–1 to claim their 5th CAF Super Cup.

Teams

Rules
The CAF Super Cup was played as a single match, with the CAF Champions League winner hosting the match. If the score was tied at the end of regulation, the penalty shoot-out was used to determine the winner (no extra time was played).

Match

References

External links

2013
Super
Al Ahly SC matches
AC Léopards matches